Klinikum Berlin Mitte – Leben in Bereitschaft is a German television series.

See also
List of German television series

External links
 

German medical television series
Television shows set in Berlin
1999 German television series debuts
2002 German television series endings
German-language television shows
ProSieben original programming